The 2008–09 season is Canberra United's first season of football (soccer) in Australia, and competed in the 2008–09 W-League season.

Season
The first announcement of the club came in July 2008, coinciding with the establishment of the new W-League.  The formation of the new club presented a unique situation in the league, that it was not associated with an established A-League side.  In August, Canberra appointed Matildas assistant coach Robbie Hooker as coach for the inaugural season, and ACT Senator Kate Lundy as club chair.   United also announced its first key signing in local Canberran and Matildas goalkeeper Lydia Williams.  Hooker made a number of key signings in the first registration window, also securing Caitlin Munoz, Amy Chapman, Grace Gill-McGrath, Hayley Crawford, Rhian Davies, Thea Slatyer for the inaugural season.  The squad was further expanded in the lead up to the first round, signing on a number of players from the ACT and Southern NSW, and also signing Sasha McDonnell and Kara Mowbray from Queensland.  The final squad presented significant strength on paper, boasting eight full internationals and a further four Young Matildas.

United started the season steadily, alternating losses and wins in the opening rounds - including a win over eventual Premiers Queensland Roar.  Scoring came with some difficulty for the side, with four goals in their opening first five matches.  Influencing this record was an injury to striker Caitlin Munoz in Round 1, keeping her sidelined for a number of weeks.  Munoz's return to the side in Round 6 immediately lifted the scoring rate, contributing four goals in the last five rounds.  Despite early losses, Canberra were unbeaten in the last seven rounds of the competition, achieving a third placed finish with a record of four wins, four draws and two losses.  Canberra's strength throughout the season has been in defence, drawn from a number of experienced players.  In front of a dependable Williams in goal, a defensive backline led by Thea Slatyer and captain Ellie Brush frustrated opposition and ensured the second-best defensive record in the competition, bettered only by Premiers Queensland.

United won their away semi-final against Newcastle Jets, and progressed to the inaugural final, where they were defeated by Queensland Roar.

Fixtures

Standings

Players

Short-term signings

References

Canberra United FC seasons
Canberra United W-League